The 2011 Supertaça de Angola (24th edition) was contested by Recreativo do Libolo, the 2010 Girabola champion and Petro de Luanda, the 2010 Angola cup winner. On home court, ASA beat Interclube 1–0 to secure their 1st title as the away match in ended in a scoreless draw.

Match details

First Leg

Second Leg

See also
 2010 Angola Cup
 2010 Girabola
 ASA players
 Interclube players

External links
 Match photos

References

Supertaça de Angola
Super Cup